Light pollution is the presence of unwanted, inappropriate, or excessive artificial lighting. In a descriptive sense, the term light pollution refers to the effects of any poorly implemented lighting, during the day or night. Light pollution can be understood not only as a phenomenon resulting from a specific source or kind of pollution, but also as a contributor to the wider, collective impact of various sources of pollution.

Although this type of pollution can exist throughout the day, its effects are magnified during the night with the contrast of darkness. It has been estimated that 83 percent of the world's people live under light-polluted skies and that 23 percent of the world's land area is affected by skyglow.
The area affected by artificial illumination continues to increase.
A major side-effect of urbanization, light pollution is blamed for compromising health, disrupting ecosystems, and spoiling aesthetic environments. Globally, it has increased by at least 49% from 1992 to 2017.

Solutions to light pollution are often easy steps like adjusting light fixtures or using more appropriate lightbulbs. However, because it is a manmade phenomenon, addressing its impacts on humans and the wider ecological systems of Earth involves vast societal complexities that overlay light pollution with political, social, and economic considerations.

Definitions

Light pollution is the presence of anthropogenic artificial light in otherwise dark conditions.

The term is most commonly used in relation to in the outdoor environment and surrounding, but is also used to refer to artificial light indoors. Adverse consequences are multiple; some of them may not be known yet. Light pollution competes with starlight in the night sky for urban residents, interferes with astronomical observatories, and, like any other form of pollution, disrupts ecosystems and has adverse health effects.

Light pollution is a side-effect of industrial civilization. Its sources include building exterior and interior lighting, advertising, outdoor area lighting (such as car parks), offices, factories, streetlights, and illuminated sporting venues. It is most severe in highly industrialized, densely populated areas of North America, Europe, and Asia and in major cities in the Middle East and North Africa like Tehran and Cairo, but even relatively small amounts of light can be noticed and create problems. Awareness of the deleterious effects of light pollution began in the second half of the 19th century, but efforts to address effects did not begin until the 1950s. In the 1980s a global dark-sky movement emerged with the founding of the International Dark-Sky Association (IDA). There are now such educational and advocacy organizations in many countries worldwide.

About 83% of people, including 99% of Europeans and Americans, live under light-polluted skies that are more than 10% brighter than natural darkness.  80% of North Americans cannot see the Milky Way galaxy.

Remediation

Energy conservation advocates contend that light pollution must be addressed by changing the habits of society, so that lighting is used more efficiently, with less waste and less creation of unwanted or unneeded illumination. Several industry groups also recognize light pollution as an important issue. For example, the Institution of Lighting Engineers in the United Kingdom provides its members with information about light pollution, the problems it causes, and how to reduce its impact. Although, recent research point that the energy efficiency is not enough to reduce the light pollution because of the rebound effect.

Since people may disagree over whether any particular lighting source is irritating or how important its effects on non-human life are, it is common for one person to consider as light pollution something that another finds desirable. One example is found in advertising, when an advertiser wishes for particular lights to be bright and visible while others find them annoying. Other types of light pollution are less disputed. For instance, light that accidentally crosses a property boundary and annoys a neighbour is generally considered wasted and pollutive.

For this reason and others, decisions about how to manage artificial light are often marked by disputes. Differences of opinion over what light is reasonable and who should have authority and responsibility sometimes make it necessary for parties to negotiate. Where it is desired that such decisions be supported by objective data, light levels can be quantified by field measurement or mathematical modeling, the results of which are typically rendered in isophote maps or light contour maps. To deal with light pollution, authorities have taken a variety of measures depending on the interests, beliefs, and understandings of the society involved. These measures range from doing nothing at all to implementing strict laws and regulations specifying how lights may be installed and used.

Types

Light pollution is caused by inefficient or unnecessary use of artificial light. Specific categories of light pollution include light trespass, over-illumination, glare, light clutter, and skyglow. A single offending light source often falls into more than one of these categories.

Light trespass

Light trespass occurs when unwanted light enters one's property, for instance, by shining over a neighbour's fence. A common light trespass problem occurs when a strong light enters the window of one's home from the outside, causing problems such as sleep deprivation. A number of cities in the U.S. have developed standards for outdoor lighting to protect the rights of their citizens against light trespass. To assist them, the International Dark-Sky Association has developed a set of model lighting ordinances.

The Dark-Sky Association was started to reduce the light going up into the sky which reduces the visibility of stars (see Skyglow below). This is any light that is emitted more than 90° above nadir. By limiting light at this 90° mark they have also reduced the light output in the 80–90° range which creates most of the light trespass issues.

U.S. federal agencies may also enforce standards and process complaints within their areas of jurisdiction. For instance, in the case of light trespass by white strobe lighting from communication towers in excess of FAA minimum lighting requirements the Federal Communications Commission maintains an Antenna Structure Registration database information which citizens may use to identify offending structures and provides a mechanism for processing citizen inquiries and complaints. The U.S. Green Building Council (USGBC) has also incorporated a credit for reducing the amount of light trespass and sky glow into their environmentally friendly building standard known as LEED.

Light trespass can be reduced by selecting light fixtures that limit the amount of light emitted more than 80° above the nadir. The IESNA definitions include full cutoff (0%), cutoff (10%), and semi-cutoff (20%). (These definitions also include limits on light emitted above 90° to reduce sky glow.)

Over-illumination

Over-illumination is the excessive use of light.

In the USA commercial building lighting consumes in excess of 81.68 terawatt-hours (1999 data) of electricity per year, according to the DOE. Even among developed countries there are large differences in patterns of light use. American cities emit three to five times more light to space per capita compared to German cities.

Over-illumination stems from several factors:

 Consensus-based standards or norms that are not based on vision science;
 Improper design, by specifying higher levels of light than needed for a given visual task;
 Incorrect choice of fixtures or light bulbs, which do not direct light into areas as needed;
 Improper selection of hardware to utilize more energy than needed to accomplish the lighting task;
 Incomplete training of building managers and occupants to use lighting systems efficiently;
 Inadequate lighting maintenance resulting in increased stray light and energy costs;
 "Daylight lighting" demanded by citizens to reduce crime or by shop owners to attract customers;
 Substitution of old lamps with more efficient LEDs using the same electrical power; and
 Indirect lighting techniques, such as illuminating a vertical wall to bounce light onto the ground.
 Morally dubious "will-to-power" by institutions who illuminate their buildings not in order to help us find our way in the dark, but "to show us that empire is inescapable".

Most of these issues can be readily corrected with available, inexpensive technology, and with the resolution of landlord/tenant practices that create barriers to rapid correction of these matters. Most importantly, public awareness would need to improve for industrialized countries to realize the large payoff in reducing over-illumination.

In certain cases, an over-illumination lighting technique may be needed. For example, indirect lighting is often used to obtain a "softer" look, since hard direct lighting is generally found less desirable for certain surfaces, such as skin. The indirect lighting method is perceived as cozier and suits bars, restaurants, and living quarters. It is also possible to block the direct lighting effect by adding softening filters or other solutions, though intensity will be reduced.

Glare

Glare can be categorized into different types. One such classification is described in a book by Bob Mizon, coordinator for the British Astronomical Association's Campaign for Dark Skies, as follows:
 Blinding glare describes effects such as that caused by staring into the Sun. It is completely blinding and leaves temporary or permanent vision deficiencies.
 Disability glare describes effects such as being blinded by oncoming car lights, or light scattering in fog or in the eye, reducing contrast, as well as reflections from print and other dark areas that render them bright, with a significant reduction in sight capabilities.
 Discomfort glare does not typically cause a dangerous situation in itself, though it is annoying and irritating at best. It can potentially cause fatigue if experienced over extended periods.

According to Mario Motta, president of the Massachusetts Medical Society, "...glare from bad lighting is a public-health hazard—especially the older you become. Glare light scattering in the eye causes loss of contrast and leads to unsafe driving conditions, much like the glare on a dirty windshield from low-angle sunlight or the high beams from an oncoming car." In essence bright and/or badly shielded lights around roads can partially blind drivers or pedestrians and contribute to accidents.

The blinding effect is caused in large part by reduced contrast due to light scattering in the eye by excessive brightness, or to the reflection of light from dark areas in the field of vision, with luminance similar to the background luminance. This kind of glare is a particular instance of disability glare, called veiling glare. (This is not the same as loss of accommodation of night vision which is caused by the direct effect of the light itself on the eye.)

Light clutter

Light clutter refers to excessive groupings of lights. Groupings of lights may generate confusion, distract from obstacles (including those that they may be intended to illuminate), and potentially cause accidents. Clutter is particularly noticeable on roads where the street lights are badly designed, or where brightly lit advertisements surround the roadways. Depending on the motives of the person or organization that installed the lights, their placement and design can even be intended to distract drivers, and can contribute to accidents.

From satellites

Another source of light pollution are artificial satellites. With future increase in numbers of satellite constellations such as OneWeb and Starlink, it is feared especially by the astronomical community, such as the IAU that light pollution will increase significantly, beside other problems of satellite overcrowding.

Public discourse surrounding the anticipated growth of satellite constellation, like OneWeb and Starlink, includes multiple petitions by astronomers and citizen scientists, and has raised questions about which regulatory bodies hold jurisdiction over human actions that obscure starlight.

Measurement

Issues to measuring light pollution 
Measuring the effect of sky glow on a global scale is a complex procedure. The natural atmosphere is not completely dark, even in the absence of terrestrial sources of light and illumination from the Moon. This is caused by two main sources: airglow and scattered light.

At high altitudes, primarily above the mesosphere, there is enough UV radiation from the sun at very short wavelengths to cause ionization. When the ions collide with electrically neutral particles they recombine and emit photons in the process, causing airglow. The degree of ionization is sufficiently large to allow a constant emission of radiation even during the night when the upper atmosphere is in the Earth's shadow. Lower in the atmosphere all the solar photons with energies above the ionization potential of N2 and O2 have already been absorbed by the higher layers and thus no appreciable ionization occurs.

Apart from emitting light, the sky also scatters incoming light, primarily from distant stars and the Milky Way, but also the zodiacal light, sunlight that is reflected and backscattered from interplanetary dust particles.

The amount of airglow and zodiacal light is quite varied (depending, amongst other things on sunspot activity and the Solar cycle) but given optimal conditions, the darkest possible sky has a brightness of about 22 magnitude/square arc second. If a full moon is present, the sky brightness increases to about 18 magnitude/sq. arcsecond depending on local atmospheric transparency, 40 times brighter than the darkest sky. In densely populated areas a sky brightness of 17 magnitude/sq. an arcsecond is not uncommon, or as much as 100 times brighter than is natural.

Satellite imagery measuring 
To precisely measure how bright the sky gets, night time satellite imagery of the earth is used as raw input for the number and intensity of light sources. These are put into a physical model of scattering due to air molecules and aerosoles to calculate cumulative sky brightness. Maps that show the enhanced sky brightness have been prepared for the entire world.

Bortle scale 
The Bortle scale is a nine-level measuring system used to track how much light pollution there is in the sky. A Bortle scale of five or less is required to see the Milky Way whilst one is "pristine", the darkest possible.

Global impact

Europe 

Global effects of light pollution are also made obvious. Research in the late 1990s showed that the entire area consisting of southern England, Netherlands, Belgium, West Germany, and northern France have a sky brightness of at least two to four times normal. The only places in continental Europe where the sky can attain its natural darkness are in northern Scandinavia and in islands far from the continent. The growth of light pollution on the green band has been 11% from 2012-2013 to 2014-2020, and 24% on the blue band.

North America 
In North America the situation is comparable. There is a significant problem with light pollution ranging from the Canadian Maritime Provinces to the American Southwest. The International Dark-Sky Association works to designate areas that have high-quality night skies. These areas are supported by communities and organizations that are dedicated to reducing light pollution (e.g. Dark-sky preserve). The National Park Service Natural Sounds and Night Skies Division has measured night sky quality in national park units across the U.S. Sky quality in the U.S. ranges from pristine (Capitol Reef National Park and Big Bend National Park) to severely degraded (Santa Monica Mountains National Recreation Area and Biscayne National Park). The National Park Service Night Sky Program monitoring database is available online (2015).

East Asia 
Light pollution in Hong Kong was declared the 'worst on the planet' in March 2013.

In June 2016, it was estimated that one third of the world's population could no longer see the Milky Way, including 80% of Americans and 60% of Europeans. Singapore was found to be the most light-polluted country in the world.

Over the past 21 years, China's provincial capital cities have seen a major increase in light pollution, with hotspots along the eastern coastline region.

Consequences

Public health impact 

Medical research on the effects of excessive light on the human body suggests that a variety of adverse health effects may be caused by light pollution or excessive light exposure, and some lighting design textbooks use human health as an explicit criterion for proper interior lighting. Health effects of over-illumination or improper spectral composition of light may include: increased headache incidence, worker fatigue, medically defined stress, decrease in sexual function and increase in anxiety. Likewise, animal models have been studied demonstrating unavoidable light to produce adverse effect on mood and anxiety. For those who need to be awake at night, light at night also has an acute effect on alertness and mood.

Outdoor artificial light at night – exposure to contemporary types such as current types of street lighting – has been linked to risks for obesity, mental disorders, diabetes, and potentially other health issues by preliminary studies.

In 2007, "shift work that involves circadian disruption" was listed as a probable carcinogen by the World Health Organization's International Agency for Research on Cancer. (IARC Press release No. 180). Multiple studies have documented a correlation between night shift work and the increased incidence of breast and prostate cancer. One study which examined the link between exposure to artificial light at night (ALAN) and levels of breast cancer in South Korea found that regions which had the highest levels of ALAN reported the highest number of cases of breast cancer. Seoul, which had the highest levels of light pollution, had 34.4% more cases of breast cancer than Ganwon-do, which had the lowest levels of light pollution. This suggested a high correlation between ALAN and the prevalence of breast cancer. It was also found that there was no correlation between other types of cancer such as cervical or lung cancer and ALAN levels.

A more recent discussion (2009), written by Professor Steven Lockley, Harvard Medical School, can be found in the CfDS handbook "Blinded by the Light?". Chapter 4, "Human health implications of light pollution" states that "...light intrusion, even if dim, is likely to have measurable effects on sleep disruption and melatonin suppression. Even if these effects are relatively small from night to night, continuous chronic circadian, sleep and hormonal disruption may have longer-term health risks". The New York Academy of Sciences hosted a meeting in 2009 on Circadian Disruption and Cancer. Red light suppresses melatonin the least.

In June 2009, the American Medical Association developed a policy in support of control of light pollution. News about the decision emphasized glare as a public health hazard leading to unsafe driving conditions. Especially in the elderly, glare produces loss of contrast, obscuring night vision.

A new 2021 study published in the Southern Economic Journal indicates that light pollution may increase by 13% in preterm births before 23 weeks of gestation.

Ecological impact 

When artificial light affects organisms and ecosystems it is called ecological light pollution. While light at night can be beneficial, neutral, or damaging for individual species, its presence invariably disturbs ecosystems. For example, some species of spiders avoid lit areas, while other species are happy to build their spider web directly on a lamp post. Since lamp posts attract many flying insects, the spiders that don't mind light gain an advantage over the spiders that avoid it. This is a simple example of the way in which species frequencies and food webs can be disturbed by the introduction of light at night.

Light pollution poses a serious threat in particular to nocturnal wildlife, having negative impacts on plant and animal physiology. It can confuse animal navigation, alter competitive interactions, change predator-prey relations, and cause physiological harm. The rhythm of life is orchestrated by the natural diurnal patterns of light and dark, so disruption to these patterns impacts the ecological dynamics. Many species of marine plankton, such as Calanus copepods, can detect light levels as low as 0.1 μWm−2; using this as a threshold a global atlas of marine Artificial Light at Night has been generated, showing its global widespread nature.

Studies suggest that light pollution around lakes prevents zooplankton, such as Daphnia, from eating surface algae, causing algal blooms that can kill off the lakes' plants and lower water quality. Light pollution may also affect ecosystems in other ways. For example, entomologists have documented that nighttime light may interfere with the ability of moths and other nocturnal insects to navigate. It can also negative impact on insect development and reproduction. Night-blooming flowers that depend on moths for pollination may be affected by night lighting, as there is no replacement pollinator that would not be affected by the artificial light. This can lead to species decline of plants that are unable to reproduce, and change an area's longterm ecology. Among nocturnal insects, fireflies (Coleoptera: Lampyridae, Phengodidae and Elateridae) are especially interesting study objects for light pollution, once they depend on their own light to reproduce and, consequently, are very sensitive to environmental levels of light. Fireflies are well known and interesting to the general public (unlike many other insects) and are easily spotted by non-experts, and, due to their sensibility and rapid response to environmental changes, good bioindicators for artificial night lighting. Significant declines in some insect populations have been suggested as being at least partially mediated by artificial lights at night.

A 2009 study also suggests deleterious impacts on animals and ecosystems because of perturbation of polarized light or artificial polarization of light (even during the day, because direction of natural polarization of sun light and its reflection is a source of information for a lot of animals). This form of pollution is named polarized light pollution (PLP). Unnatural polarized light sources can trigger maladaptive behaviors in polarization-sensitive taxa and alter ecological interactions.

Lights on tall structures can disorient migrating birds. Estimates by the U.S. Fish and Wildlife Service of the number of birds killed after being attracted to tall towers range from four to five million per year to an order of magnitude higher. The Fatal Light Awareness Program (FLAP) works with building owners in Toronto, Ontario, Canada and other cities to reduce mortality of birds by turning out lights during migration periods. Another study has found that the lights produced by the Post Tower has affected 25 bird species. As a result, they discovered that decreasing the use of excessive lights increased the survival rate of bird species.

Similar disorientation has also been noted for bird species migrating close to offshore production and drilling facilities. Studies carried out by Nederlandse Aardolie Maatschappij b.v. (NAM) and Shell have led to the development and trial of new lighting technologies in the North Sea. In early 2007, the lights were installed on the Shell production platform L15. The experiment proved a great success since the number of birds circling the platform declined by 50 to 90%.

Birds migrate at night for several reasons. Save water from dehydration in hot day flying and part of the bird's navigation system works with stars in some way. With city light outshining the night sky, birds (and also about mammals) no longer navigate by stars.

Sea turtle hatchlings emerging from nests on beaches are another casualty of light pollution. It is a common misconception that hatchling sea turtles are attracted to the moon. Rather, they find the ocean by moving away from the dark silhouette of dunes and their vegetation, a behavior with which artificial lights interfere. The breeding activity and reproductive phenology of toads, however, are cued by moonlight. Juvenile seabirds may also be disoriented by lights as they leave their nests and fly out to sea. Amphibians and reptiles are also affected by light pollution. Introduced light sources during normally dark periods can disrupt levels of melatonin production. Melatonin is a hormone that regulates photoperiodic physiology and behaviour. Some species of frogs and salamanders utilize a light-dependent "compass" to orient their migratory behaviour to breeding sites. Introduced light can also cause developmental irregularities, such as retinal damage, reduced juvenile growth, premature metamorphosis, reduced sperm production, and genetic mutation. Close to global coastal megacities (e.g. Tokyo, Shanghai), the natural illumination cycles provided by the moon in the marine environment are considerably disrupted by light pollution, with only nights around the full moon providing greater radiances, and over a given month lunar dosages may be a factor of 6 less than light pollution dosages.

In September 2009, the 9th European Dark-Sky Symposium in Armagh, Northern Ireland had a session on the environmental effects of light at night (LAN). It dealt with bats, turtles, the "hidden" harms of LAN, and many other topics. The environmental effects of LAN were mentioned as early as 1897, in a Los Angeles Times article. The following is an excerpt from that article, called "Electricity and English songbirds":

Effect on astronomy

Astronomy is very sensitive to light pollution. The night sky viewed from a city bears no resemblance to what can be seen from dark skies. Skyglow (the scattering of light in the atmosphere at night) reduces the contrast between stars and galaxies and the sky itself, making it much harder to see fainter objects. This is one factor that has caused newer telescopes to be built in increasingly remote areas.

Even at apparent clear night skies, there can be a lot of stray light that becomes visible at longer exposure times in astrophotography. By means of software, the stray light can be reduced, but at the same time, object detail will be lost in the image. The following picture of the area around the Pinwheel Galaxy (Messier 101) with the apparent magnitude of 7.5m with all stars down to an apparent magnitude of 10m was taken in Berlin in a direction close to the zenith with a fast lens (f-number 1.2) and an exposure time of five seconds at an exposure index of ISO 12800:

Some astronomers use narrow-band "nebula filters", which allow only specific wavelengths of light commonly seen in nebulae, or broad-band "light pollution filters", which are designed to reduce (but not eliminate) the effects of light pollution by filtering out spectral lines commonly emitted by sodium- and mercury-vapor lamps, thus enhancing contrast and improving the view of dim objects such as galaxies and nebulae. Unfortunately, these light pollution reduction (LPR) filters are not a cure for light pollution. LPR filters reduce the brightness of the object under study and this limits the use of higher magnifications. LPR filters work by blocking light of certain wavelengths, which alters the color of the object, often creating a pronounced green cast. Furthermore, LPR filters work only on certain object types (mainly emission nebulae) and are of little use on galaxies and stars. No filter can match the effectiveness of a dark sky for visual or photographic purposes.

Light pollution affects the visibility of diffuse sky objects like nebulae and galaxies more than stars, due to their low surface brightness. Most such objects are rendered invisible in heavily light-polluted skies above major cities. A simple method for estimating the darkness of a location is to look for the Milky Way, which from truly dark skies appears bright enough to cast a shadow.

In addition to skyglow, light trespass can impact observations when artificial light directly enters the tube of the telescope and is reflected from non-optical surfaces until it eventually reaches the eyepiece. This direct form of light pollution causes a glow across the field of view, which reduces contrast. Light trespass also makes it hard for a visual observer to become sufficiently adapted to the dark. The usual measures to reduce this glare, if reducing the light directly is not an option, include flocking the telescope tube and accessories to reduce reflection, and putting a light shield (also usable as a dew shield) on the telescope to reduce light entering from angles other than those near the target. Under these conditions, some astronomers prefer to observe under a black cloth to ensure maximum adaptation to the dark.

Increase in atmospheric pollution

A study presented at the American Geophysical Union meeting in San Francisco found that light pollution destroys nitrate radicals thus preventing the normal night time reduction of atmospheric smog produced by fumes emitted from cars and factories. The study was presented by Harald Stark from the National Oceanic and Atmospheric Administration.

Reduction of natural sky polarization

In the night, the polarization of the moonlit sky is very strongly reduced in the presence of urban light pollution, because scattered urban light is not strongly polarized. Polarized moonlight cannot be seen by humans, but is believed to be used by many animals for navigation.

Economic Impact

Research surrounding light pollution focuses on the quality of lighting and reducing our ability to clearly view the sky at night. However, light pollution has many root causes and effects across the spectrum of life. Since the time of the Industrial Revolution grew out of England and spread across the globe, major changes have been made in the way we live. Technological innovation is moving at a rapid pace. It is not uncommon to find 24-hour business, such as gas stations, convenience stores, and pharmacies. Hospitals and other healthcare facilities must be staffed 24 hours per day, seven days per week. With the rise of Amazon, many factories and shipping companies now operate 24x7 shifts to keep up with the demand of the new global consumer. These industries all require light, both inside and outside their facilities to ensure the safety of their workers as they move about their jobs and when the enter and depart the facilities. As a result, "40% of the United States and almost 20% of the European Union population has lost the ability to view the night sky…in other words, it is as if they never really experience nighttime."

With a focus on shift work and the continued need for 24-hour operations of specific sectors of the economy, researchers are looking at the impact of light pollution on this group of workers. In 2007 the International Agency for Research on Cancer (IARC) sought to bring notice to the risk from shift work as a probable risk for developing cancers. This move was the result of numerous studies that found increased risks of cancers in groups of shift workers. The 1998 Nurses Health Study found a link between breast cancer and nurses who had worked more than 30 years on rotating night shifts. However, it is not possible to halt shift work in these industries. Hospitals must be staffed around the clock.

Research suggests that, like other environmental issues, light pollution is primarily a problem caused by industrialized nations. Research by Galloway, et al. (2010) examined numerous economic indicators to get a better sense of where light pollution was occurring around the globe. Galloway's research found that countries with paved roads, a factor in a developed infrastructure, often had increased light pollution (2010). Similarly, countries with a high rate of resource extraction also have high rates of light pollution . Finally, Galloway found that countries with the highest GDP and high surface area described as urban and suburban also had the highest rates of light pollution.

China is an emerging leader in industrial and economic growth. A recent study of light pollution using the Defense Meteorological Satellite Program Operational Linescan System (DMSL/OLS) found that light pollution is increasing over the eastern coastal cities but decreasing over the industrial and mineral extraction cities. Specifically, urban areas around the Yangtze River delta, Pearl River delta, and Beijing-Tianjin area are specific light pollution areas of concern. Examining China as a whole, Jiang found that light pollution in the East and North was much higher than the West. This is consistent with major industrial factories located in the East and North while resource extraction dominates the West.

In 2010, following the United Nations declaration of The Year of Astronomy researchers urged a better understanding of artificial light and the role it plays in social, economic, and environmental issues. The researchers argues that the continued unfettered use of artificial light in urban and rural areas would cause a global shift with unpredictable outcomes. Holker argued that focusing on the economic impact of increased energy consumption in light bulbs, or the move to energy efficiency of lighting, was not enough. Rather, the broader focus should be on the socio-economic, ecologic, and physiologic impacts of light pollution. In essence, getting your package from Amazon in less than 48 hours is not a viable reason for increased light pollution.

Humans require some artificial night light for shift work, manufacturing, street safety, and nighttime driving and research has shown that artificial light disrupts the lives of animals. However, a recent article suggests that we may be able to find a happy medium. A 2021 article examined seasonal light changes and its effect on all animals, but specifically mollusks. The authors noted that light research primarily focuses on length of exposure to light. Based on their research they suggest that further research should examine the lowest quantifying the least amount of light, in terms of duration and intensity, that would allow both humans and animals to continue safely. To collect as much data as possible, scientists are recruiting the public to act as citizen scientists from various locations around the globe and enter their findings in apps and websites. By collecting and uploading sky images, star counts, agricultural data, and bird and butterfly statistics, scientists gain access to volumes of data reflecting how light pollution is affecting the world around us. Hopefully scientists can predict and recommend responses to problems before changes become permanent.

Reduction

Reducing light pollution implies many things, such as reducing sky glow, reducing glare, reducing light trespass, and reducing clutter. The method for best reducing light pollution, therefore, depends on exactly what the problem is in any given instance. Possible solutions include:
 Utilizing light sources of minimum intensity necessary to accomplish the light's purpose.
 Turning lights off using a timer or occupancy sensor or manually when not needed.
 Improving lighting fixtures, so they direct their light more accurately towards where it is needed, and with fewer side effects.
 Adjusting the type of lights used, so the light waves emitted are those that are less likely to cause severe light pollution problems. Mercury, metal halide and above all first generation of blue-light LED road luminaires are much more polluting than sodium lamps: Earth's atmosphere scatters and transmits blue light better than yellow or red light. It is a common experience observing "glare" and "fog" around and below LED road luminaires as soon as air humidity increases, while orange sodium lamp luminaires are less prone to showing this phenomenon.
 Evaluating existing lighting plans, and re-designing some or all the plans depending on whether existing light is actually needed.

Improving lighting fixtures

The use of full cutoff lighting fixtures, as much as possible, is advocated by most campaigners for the reduction of light pollution. It is also commonly recommended that lights be spaced appropriately for maximum efficiency, and that number of luminaires being used as well as the wattage of each luminaire match the needs of the particular application (based on local lighting design standards).

Full cutoff fixtures first became available in 1959 with the introduction of General Electric's M100 fixture.

A full cutoff fixture, when correctly installed, reduces the chance for light to escape above the plane of the horizontal. Light released above the horizontal may sometimes be lighting an intended target, but often serves no purpose. When it enters into the atmosphere, light contributes to sky glow. Some governments and organizations are now considering, or have already implemented, full cutoff fixtures in street lamps and stadium lighting.

The use of full cutoff fixtures helps to reduce sky glow by preventing light from escaping above the horizontal. Full cutoff typically reduces the visibility of the lamp and reflector within a luminaire, so the effects of glare are also reduced. Campaigners also commonly argue that full cutoff fixtures are more efficient than other fixtures, since light that would otherwise have escaped into the atmosphere may instead be directed towards the ground. However, full cutoff fixtures may also trap more light in the fixture than other types of luminaires, corresponding to lower luminaire efficiency, suggesting a re-design of some luminaires may be necessary.

The use of full cutoff fixtures can allow for lower wattage lamps to be used in the fixtures, producing the same or sometimes a better effect, due to being more carefully controlled. In every lighting system, some sky glow also results from light reflected from the ground. This reflection can be reduced, however, by being careful to use only the lowest wattage necessary for the lamp, and setting spacing between lights appropriately. Assuring luminaire setback is greater than 90° from highly reflective surfaces also diminishes reflectance.

A common criticism of full cutoff lighting fixtures is that they are sometimes not as aesthetically pleasing to look at. This is most likely because historically there has not been a large market specifically for full cutoff fixtures, and because people typically like to see the source of illumination. Due to the specificity with their direction of light, full cutoff fixtures sometimes also require expertise to install for maximum effect.

The effectiveness of using full cutoff roadway lights to combat light pollution has also been called into question. According to design investigations, luminaires with full cutoff distributions (as opposed to cutoff or semi cutoff, compared here) have to be closer together to meet the same light level, uniformity and glare requirements specified by the IESNA. These simulations optimized the height and spacing of the lights while constraining the overall design to meet the IESNA requirements, and then compared total uplight and energy consumption of different luminaire designs and powers. Cutoff designs performed better than full cutoff designs, and semi-cutoff performed better than either cutoff or full cutoff. This indicates that, in roadway installations, over-illumination or poor uniformity produced by full cutoff fixtures may be more detrimental than direct uplight created by fewer cutoff or semi-cutoff fixtures. Therefore, the overall performance of existing systems could be improved more by reducing the number of luminaires than by switching to full cutoff designs.

However, using the definition of "light pollution" from some Italian regional bills (i.e., "every irradiance of artificial light outside competence areas and particularly upward the sky") only full cutoff design prevents light pollution. The Italian Lombardy region, where only full cutoff design is allowed (Lombardy act no. 17/2000, promoted by Cielobuio-coordination for the protection of the night sky), in 2007 had the lowest per capita energy consumption for public lighting in Italy. The same legislation also imposes a minimum distance between street lamps of about four times their height, so full cut-off street lamps are the best solution to reduce both light pollution and electrical power usage.

Adjusting types of light sources

Several different types of light sources exist, each having a variety of properties that determine their appropriateness for different tasks. Particularly notable characteristics are efficiency and spectral power distribution. It is often the case that inappropriate light sources have been selected for a task, either due to ignorance or because more appropriate lighting technology was unavailable at the time of installation. Therefore, poorly chosen light sources often contribute unnecessarily to light pollution and energy waste. By updating light sources appropriately, it is often possible to reduce energy use and pollutive effects while simultaneously improving efficiency and visibility.

Some types of light sources are listed in order of energy efficiency in the table below (figures are approximate maintained values), and include their visual skyglow impact, relative to LPS lighting.

Many astronomers request that nearby communities use low-pressure sodium lights or amber Aluminium gallium indium phosphide LED as much as possible because the principal wavelength emitted is comparably easy to work around or in rare cases filter out. The low cost of operating sodium lights is another feature. In 1980, for example, San Jose, California, replaced all street lamps with low pressure sodium lamps, whose light is easier for nearby Lick Observatory to filter out. Similar programs are now in place in Arizona and Hawaii. Such yellow light sources also have significantly less visual skyglow impact, so reduce visual sky brightness and improve star visibility for everyone.

Disadvantages of low-pressure sodium lighting are that fixtures must usually be larger than competing fixtures, and that color cannot be distinguished, due to its emitting principally a single wavelength of light (see security lighting). Due to the substantial size of the lamp, particularly in higher wattages such as 135 W and 180 W, control of light emissions from low-pressure sodium luminaires is more difficult. For applications requiring more precise direction of light (such as narrow roadways) the native lamp efficacy advantage of this lamp type is decreased and may be entirely lost compared to high pressure sodium lamps. Allegations that this also leads to higher amounts of light pollution from luminaires running these lamps arise principally because of older luminaires with poor shielding, still widely in use in the UK and in some other locations. Modern low-pressure sodium fixtures with better optics and full shielding, and the decreased skyglow impacts of yellow light preserve the luminous efficacy advantage of low-pressure sodium and result in most cases is less energy consumption and less visible light pollution. Unfortunately, due to continued lack of accurate information, many lighting professionals continue to disparage low-pressure sodium, contributing to its decreased acceptance and specification in lighting standards and therefore its use. According to Narisada and Schrueder (2004), another disadvantage of low-pressure sodium lamps is that some research has found that many people find the characteristic yellow light to be less pleasing aesthetically, although they caution that this research isn't thorough enough to draw conclusions from.

Because of the increased sensitivity of the human eye to blue and green wavelengths when viewing low-luminances (the Purkinje effect) in the night sky, different sources produce dramatically different amounts of visible skyglow from the same amount of light sent into the atmosphere.

Re-designing lighting plans

In some cases, evaluation of existing plans has determined that more efficient lighting plans are possible. For instance, light pollution can be reduced by turning off unneeded outdoor lights, and lighting stadiums only when there are people inside. Timers are especially valuable for this purpose. One of the world's first coordinated legislative efforts to reduce the adverse effect of this pollution on the environment began in Flagstaff, Arizona, in the U.S. There, more than three decades of ordinance development has taken place, with the full support of the population, often with government support, with community advocates, and with the help of major local observatories, including the United States Naval Observatory Flagstaff Station. Each component helps to educate, protect and enforce the imperatives to intelligently reduce detrimental light pollution.

One example of a lighting plan assessment can be seen in a report originally commissioned by the Office of the Deputy Prime Minister in the United Kingdom, and now available through the Department for Communities and Local Government. The report details a plan to be implemented throughout the UK, for designing lighting schemes in the countryside, with a particular focus on preserving the environment.

In another example, the city of Calgary has recently replaced most residential street lights with models that are comparably energy efficient. The motivation is primarily operation cost and environmental conservation. The costs of installation are expected to be regained through energy savings within six to seven years.

The Swiss Agency for Energy Efficiency (SAFE) uses a concept that promises to be of great use in the diagnosis and design of road lighting, "consommation électrique spécifique (CES)", which can be translated into English as "specific electric power consumption (SEC)". Thus, based on observed lighting levels in a wide range of Swiss towns, SAFE has defined target values for electric power consumption per metre for roads of various categories. Thus, SAFE currently recommends an SEC of two to three watts per meter for roads less than ten metres wide (four to six for wider roads). Such a measure provides an easily applicable environmental protection constraint on conventional "norms", which usually are based on the recommendations of lighting manufacturing interests, who may not take into account environmental criteria. In view of ongoing progress in lighting technology, target SEC values will need to be periodically revised downwards.

A newer method for predicting and measuring various aspects of light pollution was described in the journal Lighting Research & Technology (September 2008). Scientists at Rensselaer Polytechnic Institute's Lighting Research Center have developed a comprehensive method called Outdoor Site-Lighting Performance (OSP), which allows users to quantify, and thus optimize, the performance of existing and planned lighting designs and applications to minimize excessive or obtrusive light leaving the boundaries of a property. OSP can be used by lighting engineers immediately, particularly for the investigation of glow and trespass (glare analyses are more complex to perform and current commercial software does not readily allow them), and can help users compare several lighting design alternatives for the same site.

In the effort to reduce light pollution, researchers have developed a "Unified System of Photometry", which is a way to measure how much or what kind of street lighting is needed. The Unified System of Photometry allows light fixtures to be designed to reduce energy use while maintaining or improving perceptions of visibility, safety, and security. There was a need to create a new system of light measurement at night because the biological way in which the eye's rods and cones process light is different in nighttime conditions versus daytime conditions. Using this new system of photometry, results from recent studies have indicated that replacing traditional, yellowish, high-pressure sodium (HPS) lights with "cool" white light sources, such as induction, fluorescent, ceramic metal halide, or LEDs can actually reduce the amount of electric power used for lighting while maintaining or improving visibility in nighttime conditions.

The International Commission on Illumination, also known as the CIE from its French title, la Commission Internationale de l'Eclairage, will soon be releasing its own form of unified photometry for outdoor lighting.

Dark sky reserves
In 2001 International Dark Sky Places Program was founded in order to encourage communities, parks and protected areas around the world to preserve and protect dark sites through responsible lighting policies and public education. As of January 2022, there are 195 certified International Dark Sky Places in the world. For example, in 2016 China launched its first dark sky reserve in the Tibet Autonomous Region's Ngari Prefecture which covers an area of 2,500 square kilometers. Such areas are important for astronomical observation.

Gallery

Videos

See also
 Roy Henry Garstang

References

Further reading 

Introductory

 Save the night in Europe. (2021). What is light pollution?.

Astronomy

 Luginbuhl, C. B., Walker, C. E., and Wainscoat R. J. (2009) "Lighting and Astronomy: Light Pollution" .

Energy

 ASSIST. (2009). Outdoor Lighting: Visual Efficacy.
 Crawford, M. (2015). LED light pollution: Can we save energy and save the night?

Environment and ecology

 Albers, S. and Duriscoe, D. (2001) Modeling Light Pollution from Population Data and Implications for National Park Service Lands.
 TAB. (2019). Light pollution – extent, societal and ecological impacts as well as approaches.

General

 Alliance for Lighting Information. (2017). Alliance for Lighting Information .
 Dobrzynski, J. H. (2009). Reclaiming the nighy sky.
 Fraknoi, A. (2018). Light pollution and dark skies: a research guide.
 Lewicki, M. (2005). Adelaide's Light Pollution – And the Solution.
 Light Pollution UK. (2006). Is light pollution killing our birds?.
 Owen, D. (2007). The Dark Side: Making war on light pollution.

Handbooks

 British Astronomical Association. (2009). Blinded by the Light?. A handbook for campaigners against the misuse of artificial light, victims of light pollution and friends of the terrestrial and celestial natural environments.

Industrialisation

 Schivelbusch, W. (1998). Disenchanted Night: The Industrialization of Light in the Nineteenth Century.

Reading lists

 Kyba, C. (2012). Light pollution papers (and books).

UK

 Hillarys. (2021). Skyglow: light pollution & the UK's changing skies.

External links

Campaigns and research organizations

Conferences and events 

 The Urban Wildlands Group (2002) Ecological Consequences of Artificial Night Lighting: Conference
 ISTIL (2002). The Venice Meeting - Light Pollution Science and Technology Institute
 NOAO (2009). Dark skies awareness: an IYA2009 cornerstone project.

Interactive materials 

 Need-Less —Interactive simulations that demonstrate the effects of light pollution
 Night Eart. Earth at night.

Scientific models 

 Cool, A. D. (2010). German skyglow for population by postcode according to Walker's law.

Presentations 

 Technical slide show "Lamp Spectrum and Light Pollution: The Other Side of Light Pollution"

 
Pollution
Light sources
Lighting
Observational astronomy
Visibility